Hira Salman (née Saleem; born 27 February 1989), known as Hira Mani, is a Pakistani television actress, singer, presenter and former video jockey. She starred as lead in several hit series, including Jab We Wed (2014), Preet Na Kariyo Koi (2015), Sun Yaara (2016) Yaqeen Ka Safar (2017), Thays (2018), Do Bol (2019), Ghalati (2020), Kashf (2020), Yun Tu Hai Pyar Bohut (2021) and Mein Hari Piya (2021).

Personal life
Hira married fellow actor Salman Saqib Sheikh (Mani) at the age of 19. Their marriage ceremony took place on 18 April 2008. They frequently work together in most of their projects. The couple have two sons; Muzammil (born in 2009) and Ibrahim (born in 2014). In May 2021, Hira was robbed outside her home, the video of which went viral.

Career
Hira started her career as a video jockey before moving on to hosting. She co-hosted the show Hum 2 Hamara Show on Hum TV with Mani which earned her critical recognition and they both followed it with the Hira Mani Show (2010). Hira made her acting debut along with her husband Mani in ARY Digital's Meri Teri Kahani (2012). The show was inspired by the American series Curb Your Enthusiasm. Both (Mani and Hira) appeared as fictionalized versions of themselves. She then appeared as Heer in Jab We Wed (2013) and as Hareem in Firaaq (2013). In 2015, she portrayed the role of Shagufta in Hum TV's Preet Na Kariyo Koi opposite Ahsan Khan. She received critical praise for portraying an emotionally intense character in the serial. She later appeared as a guest in Mr. Shamim (2016) and Kitni Girhain Baaki Hain 2 (2016).

Television

Special appearance

Music video

Discography

Awards and nominations

References

External links 

Pakistani television actresses
Actresses from Karachi
Living people
1989 births